Bernd Girod (born December 1, 1957) is a German-American engineer, the Robert L. and Audrey S. Hancock Professor of Electrical Engineering at Stanford University. Girod is a member of the National Academy of Engineering

Education and Career 
Girod received his M.S. in electrical engineering from Georgia Institute of Technology (1980) and his Dr.-Ing in electrical engineering from the University of Hannover, Germany (1987).

Prior to Stanford, he was a professor of electrical engineering at the University of Erlangen– Nuremberg and an assistant professor of media technology at the MIT Media Lab.

Research

His research interests are in image and video coding, computer vision, and multimedia systems.

Girod's research has been central in startup ventures, including Polycom, Vivo Software, 8x8, and RealNetworks. He holds nearly 40 patents.

Professional activities 
He is a Faculty Co-Director of the Stanford Center for Image Systems Engineering (SCIEN) and a Director of the Max Planck Center for Visual Computing and Communication. He was Founding Director of David and Helen Gurley Brown Institute for Media Innovations (2012-2015), a Senior Associate Dean for the Online Learning and Professional Development, School of Engineering at Stanford University (2012-2015), and a Senior Associate Dean at large for the School of Engineering at Stanford University  (2015-2016).

He is currently an advisor of the Brown Institute for Media Innovation.

Selected publications

Awards and honors
 Elected Member of the National Academy of Engineering 2015
 Technical Achievement Award, IEEE Signal Processing Society 2011,  “for his contributions to the theory and practice of video communications, search and processing.”
 Elected Member of the German National Academy of Sciences (Leopoldina) 2007
 Fellow, IEEE 1998. His citation reads, “For contributions to the theory and practice of video communication.”

References

External links
 Google Scholar, Bernd Girod
 Stanford Profiles: Bernd Girod

Living people
Stanford University Department of Electrical Engineering faculty
American computer scientists
Stanford University School of Engineering faculty
Fellow Members of the IEEE
21st-century American engineers
Georgia Tech alumni
University of Hanover alumni
1957 births